This is the first edition of the event as a WTA 125 tournament. It was part of the ITF Women's Circuit from 2016 to 2018. Alexandra Cadanțu and Chantal Škamlová were the champions when the event was last held in 2018, but neither player participates this year.

Anna Bondár and Kimberley Zimmermann won the title, defeating Jesika Malečková and Renata Voráčová in the final, 6–3, 2–6, [10–5].

Seeds

Draw

Draw

References

External Links
Main Draw at wtatennis.com

Budapest Open - Doubles